Johannes Thomas Forceville (1696–1750) was an organ builder and son of the famous organ builder Johannes Baptist Forceville (1660–1739). He is therefore often called "the younger".

Biography
Johannes Thomas Forceville was born in Antwerp, where he was baptized on 5 July 1696. He was the son of Jean-Baptist, the first organ builder of the Forceville family who had moved to Antwerp from Saint-Omer, and his first wife Magdalena Cannaert. He received his education mainly from his father during the construction of the organ for St. Gudula in Brussels between 1706 and 1718.

Brussels remained his chief area of activity. He started working autonomously since at least 1734, when he restored the organ of the Church of Our Lady of Laeken in association with Egide Le Blas. He returned to the atelier of his father in 1737, succeeding him in the works for the Chapelle royale of Brussels.

See also
Forceville (organ builders)

References

1696 births
1750 deaths
Belgian pipe organ builders
People from Antwerp